The Painted Woman is a 1932 American pre-Code thriller film starring Spencer Tracy, Peggy Shannon and Irving Pichel and directed by John G. Blystone.

Plot
After becoming involved in a killing, Kiddo gets on board Boyton's ship. When he learns what happened he dumps her on a South Sea island. Tom Brian marries her, and when Boynton returns he's furious (he wanted to marry her). When Boyton is killed Kiddo is accused of the crime and even Tom thinks she's guilty.

Cast
 Spencer Tracy as Tom Brian
 Peggy Shannon as Kiddo
 William 'Stage' Boyd as Captain Boynton
 Irving Pichel as Robert Dunn, Lawyer
 Raul Roulien as Jim Kikela
 Murray Kinnell as Collins
 Laska Winter as Tia Marquette

References

External links
 The Painted Woman, imdb.com; accessed August 10, 2015.
 

American thriller films
1932 films
Films directed by John G. Blystone
Fox Film films
Films produced by William Fox
American black-and-white films
1930s thriller films
1930s English-language films
1930s American films